Monica Sabolo (born 27 July 1971 in Milan) is a French writer and journalist.

Biography 
Sabolo grew up in Geneva and now lives in Paris. As a journalist, she was editor of Grazia. Her book Tout cela n'a rien à voir avec moi won the Prix de Flore in 2013. Published in 2022, La vie clandestine combines an exploration of the militant group Action directe with a personal history from her childhood and was long-listed for the Prix Goncourt and the Prix Renaudot.

Books 
 Le Roman de Lili, éditions Jean-Claude Lattès, 2000, 188 p. 
 Jungle, éditions JC Lattès, 2005, 299 p. 
 Tout cela n'a rien à voir avec moi, éditions JC Lattès, 2013, 153 p. 
 Crans-Montana, éditions JC Lattès, 2015, 240 p. 
 Summer, éditions JC Lattès, 2017, 320 p. 
 Éden, éditions Gallimard, 2019, 288 p. 
 La Vie clandestine, Gallimard, 2022, 336 p.

References 

Living people
21st-century French novelists
1971 births